Houseman may refer to:

Houseman (surname)
House officer (disambiguation), a junior doctor in a British or Irish hospital
Useful man, a grade of domestic worker below footman

See also 
Hausmann, a surname
Housman (surname)